E. gigas  may refer to:
 Entada gigas, the cœur de la mer or sea heart, a flowering liana species native to Central America, the Caribbean, northern South America and Africa
 Eustrombus gigas, the queen conch, a very large edible sea snail species

See also
 Gigas (disambiguation)